KESHER should not be confused with various U.S. synagogues incorporating the word Kesher into their names.

KESHER (from Hebrew קשר 'linkage', 'connection') is the now-defunct college outreach arm and campus student organization for Reform Judaism. It was formally disbanded in 2009, though it continued to operate Taglit Birthright Israel trips, under the brand "URJ Kesher" for several more years. There are no longer any official college programs run by the URJ.

Its directors included Paul Reichenbach (-1995), David Terdiman (1995-7), Rabbi Jonathan Klein (1997-2000), Rabbi Andrew Davids, Rabbi Marc Israel, Lisa David (-2006); Nicole Rand was the latest acting director.  There had been two program associates and an Israeli shaliach.

KESHER worked with organizations like Hillel to create Reform Jewish programs on campuses across North America.  They were a member of the Israel Campus Coalition and sponsored the Argentina Ambassadors trip.   KESHER also hosted a Leadership Training Seminar during the spring semester, coordinated by members of the KESHER Student Leadership Council.  This council was made of 6-7 junior and senior students who applied each year for one or two terms (a school year). Through its (now-defunct) http://keshercollege.org/ website, the group disseminated many documents describing the connection between Reform Judaism and North American Jewish youth.

See also
Union for Reform Judaism

References

External links
URJ Youth: Go Kesher Official Website
 2011 archive of KesherCollege.org
 2018 archive of Union of Reform Judaism college life page

Reform Judaism outreach
Student religious organizations in the United States